Orazi e Curiazi (The Horatii and the Curiatii) is an opera by the Italian composer Saverio Mercadante. It takes the form of a tragedia lirica in three acts. The libretto, by Salvadore Cammarano, is based on the Roman legend of the fight between Horatii and Curiatii. It was first performed at the Teatro San Carlo, Naples, on 10 November 1846.

Roles

Recordings

References

Further reading
Black, John, The Italian Romantic Libretto: A Study of Salvadore Cammarano, Edinburgh University Press, 1984  
Rose, Michael (1998),  “Mercandante, (Giuseppe) Saverio (Raffaele)" in Stanley Sadie, (ed.), The New Grove Dictionary of Opera, vol. 3, pp. 334–339. London: Macmillan Publishers, Inc.   
Rose, Michael (2001), in Holden, Amanda,(ed.), The New Penguin Opera Guide, New York: Penguin Putnam, Inc.

External links

Operas by Saverio Mercadante
Italian-language operas
1846 operas
Operas
Opera world premieres at the Teatro San Carlo
Operas set in ancient Rome